Kachkalyk (Dargwa: Качкалик; ,Qaçqalıq) is a rural locality (a selo) in Chankubinsky Selsoviet, Buynaksky District, Republic of Dagestan, Russia. The population was 421 as of 2010. There are 3 streets.

Geography 
Kachkalyk is located 34 km southeast of Buynaksk (the district's administrative centre) by road. Chankurbe and Kadar are the nearest rural localities.

References 

Rural localities in Buynaksky District